Lamontia is a genus of calcareous sponges in the family Baeriidae. It consists of one species, Lamontia zona Kirk, 1895. The genus and species were described by New Zealand biologist Harry Borrer Kirk in 1895. The type locality of Lamontia zona is Cook Strait, New Zealand.

References

Calcaronea
Monotypic sponge genera
Animals described in 1895